Walter Trampler (August 25, 1915 – September 27, 1997) was a German musician and teacher of the viola and viola d'amore.

Born in Munich, he was given his first lessons at age six by his violinist father. While still in his youth, he played well enough to tour Europe as violist of the prestigious Strub Quartet. In the mid-1930s, he recorded with Max Strub and Florizel von Reuter (violins) and Ludwig Hoelscher (cello) (i.e. the second formation of the Strub Quartet) and Elly Ney (piano). Later, he was principal violist of the Berlin Radio Symphony Orchestra.  He left the quartet and emigrated to the United States in 1939.  After U.S. Army service in World War II he returned to music, teaching, performing, and recording.  He was a founding member of The Chamber Music Society of Lincoln Center, and succeeded David Schwartz as violist of the Yale Quartet with Broadus Erle and Syoko Aki (violins) and Aldo Parisot (cello).

His musical interest spanned several centuries, from Baroque to 20th-century works, even inspiring Luciano Berio to write a piece for him.  He made numerous recordings.  In addition to performing extensively in Europe and the United States as a soloist and a chamber musician, he also taught many students at Juilliard, the New England Conservatory, the Yale School of Music (see this) and  Boston University.

He died in Port Joli, Nova Scotia, Canada, in 1997.

References

External links
Walter Trampler papers, 1904-2005 Music Division, The New York Public Library.
Article by Myron Rosenblum in memory of Trampler
Walter Trampler Remembered, another page in memoriam
Info Please Walter Trampler page

1915 births
1997 deaths
Musicians from Munich
German classical violists
German classical viola d'amore players
American classical violists
American classical viola d'amore players
Juilliard School faculty
20th-century classical musicians
20th-century American musicians
20th-century German musicians
20th-century violists